Trifurcula cryptella is a moth of the family Nepticulidae. It is widespread throughout Europe, northwards to southern parts of Norway and Sweden (but not in Finland), eastwards to Poland and the Balkan Peninsula, and south to the Mediterranean countries, but there it is rare and confined to mountainous regions. In Italy it has only been recorded from the northern part, in Portugal in the Serra da Estrêla, in Spain in the Cantabrian Mountains and possibly the Sierra Nevada. It is absent from the Mediterranean islands.

The wingspan is 4-4.6 mm. The thick erect hairs on the head vertex are ferruginous-yellowish, sometimes mixed with fuscous. The collar is bright yellow. Antennal eyecaps are whitish. The forewings are pale greyish, coarsely irrorated with dark fuscous outer part of cilia whitish-grey. Hindwings grey. External image

The larvae feed on Anthyllis montana, Coronilla coronata, Coronilla emerus, Coronilla emerus emeroides, Coronilla varia, Hippocrepis comosa, Lotus corniculatus, Lotus hispidus, Lotus pedunculatus and Lotus uliginosus. They mine the leaves of their host plant. The mine consists of a long corridor with a very broad, green frass line. This corridor suddenly widens into a broad blotch that in the end may occupy almost an entire leaflet. Pupation takes place outside of the mine.

References

External links
Review Of The Subgenus Trifurcula (Levarchama), With Two New Species (Lepidoptera: Nepticulidae)
bladmineerders.nl
 lepiforum.de
 Swedish Moths
 Figures of genitalia

Nepticulidae
Moths of Europe
Moths described in 1856